The 1988 South African Professional Championship was a non-ranking snooker tournament, which took place in January 1988.
The tournament featured four South African players.

Francois Ellis won the title, beating Jimmy van Rensberg 9–4 in the final.

Main draw

References

South African Professional Championship
South African Professional Championship
South African Professional Championship
South African Professional Championship